Pro Wrestling America is a professional wrestling promotion based in Minneapolis, Minnesota since 1985. Former employees in PWA consisted of professional wrestlers, managers, play-by-play and color commentators, announcers, interviewers and referees.

Alumni

Male wrestlers

Midget wrestlers

Stables and tag teams

Managers and valets

Other personnel

References
General

Specific

External links
Upper Midwest Wrestling Newsletter archives
Midwest Wrestling: Pro-Wrestling America (1982-1998)
Pro Wrestling America alumni at Cagematch.net
Pro Wrestling America alumni at Wrestlingdata.com

Pro Wrestling America alumni